Clofezone (trade name Perclusone) is a drug that was used to treat joint and muscular pain, but is not marketed any more. It is a combination of clofexamide, an antidepressant, and phenylbutazone, a nonsteroidal anti-inflammatory drug (NSAID).

References 

Nonsteroidal anti-inflammatory drugs
Combination drugs